Iron Maiden: Flight 666 is a concert documentary film featuring the British heavy metal band Iron Maiden. The film follows the band on the first leg of their Somewhere Back in Time World Tour in February and March 2008, during which they travelled on their own customised Boeing 757, Ed Force One, which used the call-sign "666".

Flight 666 is co-produced by Toronto-based Banger Films, known for their documentaries Metal: A Headbanger's Journey, Global Metal and Rush: Beyond the Lighted Stage. The film was shot in high-definition video with accompanying 5.1 surround sound produced by Kevin Shirley (who has worked with the band since their 2000 album Brave New World). It was distributed by Arts Alliance Media and EMI (except in the US, where it was sub-distributed by D&E Entertainment) in select digital theatres on 21 April 2009.

Synopsis and background

Iron Maiden: Flight 666 documents the opening leg of the band's Somewhere Back in Time World Tour, which took place between February and March 2008. During this leg of the tour, the group travelled 50,000 miles (encompassing India, Australia and North and South America) in just 45 days, performing 23 shows in 13 countries to half a million fans. To achieve this, the band travelled in their own Boeing 757, nicknamed "Ed Force One" after the band's mascot, Eddie, and in the style of the U.S. president's Air Force One, which was specially converted to carry the band, their crew and twelve tonnes of equipment.

The aeroplane was largely piloted by the band's lead singer, Bruce Dickinson, who was then employed by Astraeus Airlines. According to Dickinson, who came up with the idea, Ed Force One meant they could visit countries where "The bean counters said it's just not worth going" and allowed them to "do an almost European-type itinerary, but on an inter-continental basis". As a result, the band were able to perform in Costa Rica and Colombia for the first time. The aircraft was flown under the call-sign "666", a reference to their 1982 single "The Number of the Beast", which provided the film's title.

Despite the technical aspects behind the tour, the documentary is predominantly about the group's fans, with Dickinson commenting that "Two-thirds of the film is not about us". Scenes shot in South America are particularly focused on the audiences, where Reuters report that they are "venerated like football stars", while The Daily Telegraph state that the film makers "elicit tearful eulogies" from those in Costa Rica and Colombia, then seeing the band for the first time. Dickinson asserts that the band's relationship with their fans is "the real story of Maiden", and the fact that this is the film's primary theme "is the way it should be".

The documentary was written, directed and produced by Scot McFadyen and Sam Dunn, using their production company, Banger Films. McFadyen and Dunn requested permission to shoot the film as soon as the tour was announced, which they received with just two months left to prepare. Despite the fact that the film makers had been acquainted with Iron Maiden while working on their first two documentaries, 2005's Metal: A Headbanger's Journey and 2007's Global Metal, some band members were initially mistrustful of the venture and were wary of having their privacy invaded. Although Dickinson and drummer Nicko McBrain were the most comfortable with the filming, bassist Steve Harris and guitarist Adrian Smith took longer to adapt, while guitarist Janick Gers largely ignored the crew until the final week. Following Iron Maiden: Flight 666, the band worked with Banger Films once again on their 2012 live video, En Vivo!.

Theatrical showings 
The film's world première took place at the Cine Odeon in Rio de Janeiro, Brazil on 14 March 2009, during the final leg of the band's Somewhere Back in Time World Tour. The UK première took place on 20 April 2009 at the Kensington Odeon in London. The following night, the film was screened simultaneously on over 450 screens in 41 countries globally. Distributed by Arts Alliance Media and EMI, with D&E Entertainment sub-distributing in the US, Flight 666 was shown in a 2K digital format, with 5.1 surround sound mixed by the band's producer, Kevin Shirley.

The screenings on 21 April were very successful, with Arts Alliance Media reporting that it was the largest simultaneous worldwide release of a documentary film. This led to additional showings in some territories, such as in India, where it was released on 8 May by PVR Pictures, and Australia, where it was screened from 30 April to 6 May. At the UK box office, the film grossed £84,276 (US$123,886), while making $74,134 in Australia and $35,173 in Russia CIS, totalling $233,193 from the three territories tallied.

Reception
Flight 666 was welcomed by overwhelmingly positive reviews from the music press and general media. Rock and metal magazines Kerrang! and Metal Hammer each gave the movie full marks, with Kerrang! referring to it as a "unique peek behind the Iron Curtain" that was "not to be missed" and Metal Hammer calling it a "continent-jumping, fire-breathing monster of a film". Empire gave it 4 stars and felt that the behind the scenes antics were interesting, despite lacking in drama when compared to Metallica's Metallica: Some Kind of Monster and Anvil! The Story of Anvil, and that the concert footage is "magnificent".

Flight 666 won the "24 Beats Per Second" award for best music documentary at the SXSW Film Festival in Austin, Texas, Music DVD of the Year at 2010's Juno Awards, and Best DVD at the 2009 Metal Storm awards.

Home media

Iron Maiden: Flight 666 was released on DVD and Blu-ray on 25 May 2009 by EMI. In North America, it was issued on 9 June and by Universal Music Enterprises in the US. In addition to the documentary film, the video contains the full sixteen song setlist from the Somewhere Back in Time World Tour, with each track recorded at a different venue. Alongside the DVD and Blu-ray, a double CD soundtrack album was released simultaneously, featuring the same track listing as the video concert footage. The DVD and Blu-ray release was particularly successful, peaking at No. 1 in 22 countries including the UK and US.

Soundtrack and concert footage track listing

Charts

Video

Album

Certifications
Album

Video

Credits
Production and performance credits are adapted from the Blu-ray, DVD and soundtrack album liner notes.
Iron Maiden
Bruce Dickinson – vocals
Dave Murray – guitars
Janick Gers – guitars
Adrian Smith – guitars, backing vocals
Steve Harris – bass, backing vocals, co-producer (concert audio)
Nicko McBrain – drums
Additional musician
Michael Kenney – keyboards
Film production
Scot McFadyen – producer, writer, director
Sam Dunn – producer, writer, director, narrator
Rod Smallwood – executive producer, band manager
Stefan Demetriou – executive producer
Andy Taylor – executive producer, band manager
Victoria Hirst – co-producer
Martin Hawkes – director of photography
Lisa Grooten Boer – editor
Wendy Hallum Martin – editor
Mike Munn – editor
Concert audio production
Kevin Shirley – producer, mixing
Jared Kvitka – assistant
Ryan Smith – mastering
Dave Pattenden – live audio recording
Ian Walsh – assistant
Johnny Burke – assistant
Tony Newton – assistant
Additional personnel
Peacock – art director, design
John McMurtrie – photography
Hangman – stage design

References

External links

Iron Maiden: Flight 666 at BBC Online

2009 films
British musical films
Canadian musical films
English-language Canadian films
Concert films
Iron Maiden video albums
Documentary films about heavy metal music and musicians
Documentary films about aviation
Films shot in Chile
Live heavy metal albums
2000s English-language films
2000s Canadian films
2000s British films